The Toulouse Congress was the eleventh national congress of the French Socialist Party (Parti socialiste or PS). It took place from October 11 to 13, 1985. The Congress marked the party's transition to social democracy and Jacques Delors spoke of the Congress as the French Bad Godesberg.

Results

Lionel Jospin was re-elected as First Secretary.

References

Congresses of the Socialist Party (France)
1985 in France
1985 in politics
1985 conferences
1985 political party leadership elections